A kenning (Old English  , Modern Icelandic ) is a circumlocution, an ambiguous or roundabout figure of speech, used instead of an ordinary noun in Old Norse, Old English, and later Icelandic poetry.

This list is not intended to be comprehensive. Kennings for a particular character are listed in that character's article. For example, the Odin article links to a list of names of Odin, which include kennings. A few examples of Odin's kennings are given here. For a scholarly list of kennings see Meissner's  (1921) or some editions of Snorri Sturluson's .

Source language abbreviations
OE – Old English
D – Danish
G – Germanic
Ic – Old Icelandic
N – Norse
ON – Old Norse
S – Swedish

List of Kennings

References

Icelandic literature
Old English poetry
Old Norse poetry
Poetic devices